Brachiolia amblopis is a species of moth of the family Tortricidae.

The wingspan 13 mm.

The forewings are polymorphic in pattern. The ground colour of this moth is light ashy grey with blackish markings.

Distribution
It is known from the Comoros, Mauritius, Réunion and the Seychelles (Cosmoledo and Aldabra).

References

Moths described in 1911
Tortricini